Sinomonas susongensis is a bacterium from the genus Sinomonas which has been isolated from the surface of a weathered biotite from Susong, China.

References

Bacteria described in 2015
Micrococcaceae